Apomyrma stygia is a species of ant found in West Africa, first described in 1970. It is the only species in the genus Apomyrma, tribe Apomyrmini, and subfamily Apomyrminae. It has been suggested the ant primarily lives in tropical forests, and apparently belongs to a guild of centipede-feeding ants.

References

External links

Apomyrminae
Insects described in 1970
Insects of West Africa
Monotypic ant genera
Hymenoptera of Africa